Thomas Frewen (1630–1702), of Cleybrooke House, Fulham, Middlesex, St. James's, Westminster and Brickwall House, Northiam, Sussex, was a Member of Parliament for Rye in March 1679 – 1685, 15 January – 1 April 1689, and 9 February 1694 – 1698.

References

1630 births
1702 deaths
People from Fulham
English MPs 1679
English MPs 1680–1681
English MPs 1681
English MPs 1689–1690
English MPs 1695–1698
People from Northiam